"Week End" is a song recorded in 2003 by the French singer Lorie. It was released on 15 December 2003 as the first single from Lorie's third studio album, Attitudes, on which it features as second track. The song was a great success in the countries where it was released, becoming a top ten hit.

Song information
The text was Pierre Billon and Johnny Williams, and the latter also composed the music. The music video, an Outsider Music, was directed by Vincent Egret and shot in Tignes, France. It shows the singer and some of her friends playing in the snow.

The song was performed during Lorie's tours Ween End Tour and Live Tour 2006. It was thus included on the live album Week End Tour (14th track) and on Live Tour 2006 (fifth track). It features also on Lorie's 2004 best of (eighth track).

Chart performances
In France, the single went straight to number two on 14 December 2003 and stayed there for three consecutive weeks, being unable to dislodge the Star Academy 3's "L'Orange" which topped the chart then. "Week End" dropped slowly on the chart, totaling ten weeks in the top ten, 17 weeks in the top 50 and 22 weeks in the top 100. It was certified Gold disc by the SNEP and featured at number 64 (with only three weeks on the chart) and number 32 on the Annual Charts of 2003 and 2004. As of July 2014, it was the 98th best-selling single of the 21st century in France, with 310,000 units sold.

The single entered the Belgian (Wallonia) at number 12 on 27 December, then reached a peak of number six, for four not consecutive weeks. After that, it fell quite slowly and remained for seven weeks in the top ten and 18 weeks in the top 40. It was the 40th best-selling single of 2004 in this country.

In Switzerland, the single was a top ten hit from its debut on the chart. Indeed, it started at number eight on 4 January 2004, then dropped on the chart. It featured for 11 weeks in the top 50 and 14 weeks in the top 100. and ranked number 75 on the year-end chart.

Track listings
 CD single
 "Week End" — 4:02
 "Week End" (instrumental) — 4:02

 CD maxi
 "Week End" — 4:02
 "Con sabor latino" — 3:41
 "Week End" (instrumental) — 4:02

 Digital download
 "Week End" — 4:02
 "Week End" (2004 live version) — 5:39
 "Week End" (2006 live version) — 4:08

Certifications

Charts

Peak positions

Year-end charts

References

External links
 "Week End", lyrics

2003 singles
Lorie (singer) songs